Ghatbori is a village in Maharashtra state, India. It is surrounded by hills of the Satpura Range. The village has facilities for gathering, including a meeting hall, marketplace, seven temples, and gymnasium.

Residents of the village come from more than 50 ethnicities, and live in homogeneous groups. The common language for communication is Marathi; other languages spoken include Hindi, Urdu, Banjari, and Marwari.

The majority of citizens are farmers who grow soybeans, mung beans, and cotton, though there is a professional class resident. In recent times, more young people have left the village to pursue careers across India and abroad.

The surrounding hills are known for a diverse flora and fauna. Tree species include teakwood, khair, neem, babool, mango, and arjun. Animals include parrots, sparrows, crows, vultures, owls, tigers, panthers, wolves, and snakes. Honey and gum are also plentiful. Ghatbori has a forest ranger's office.

References 

Villages in Gondia district